The Elephant Rock Ride, or rock, is an annual road and mountain bicycling event hosted in Castle Rock, Colorado. It was created by Scot Harris in 1987 as a 100-mile road bike route to be "a way to start the [Colorado] cycling season". Today there are multiple concurrent rides hosted ranging from 7 to 105 miles in order to accommodate a broad range of skill. A maximum of 7,000 participants can register each year to ride.

The Elephant Rock Ride is primarily sponsored by Subaru and the full event is called the Subaru Elephant Rock Cycling Festival.

See also
 Subaru Elephant Rock Ride (Official Site)

Notes

Castle Rock, Colorado
Cycle races in the United States
Tourist attractions in Douglas County, Colorado
Cycling in Colorado
Festivals in Colorado